Thinan-malkia is an evil spirit in Australian Aboriginal mythology that captures victims with nets that entangle their feet.

References
 

Australian Aboriginal legendary creatures